René D. Kemp (July 15, 1935 – February 4, 2006) was an American politician. He served as a Democratic member for the 139th district of the Georgia House of Representatives. He also served as a member for the 3rd district of the Georgia State Senate.

Life and career 
Kemp attended the University of Georgia.

In 1977, Kemp was elected to the 139th district of the Georgia House of Representatives. He served until 1983, when he was succeeded by James C. Moore. In 1993, Kemp was elected to the 3rd district of the Georgia State Senate, serving until 2004, when he was succeeded by Jeff Chapman.

Kemp died in February 2006 in Savannah, Georgia, at the age of 70.

References 

1935 births
2006 deaths
Democratic Party Georgia (U.S. state) state senators
Democratic Party members of the Georgia House of Representatives
20th-century American politicians
University of Georgia alumni